Orectis is a genus of litter moths of the family Erebidae. The genus was erected by Julius Lederer in 1857.

Species
Orectis euprepiata Dannehl, 1933
Orectis massiliensis Millière, 1863
Orectis proboscidata Herrich-Schäffer, 1851

References

Herminiinae
Moth genera